Ship load is a United Kingdom unit of weight for coal equal to 20 keels or .

External links 
NIST Special Publication 811, Guide for the Use of the International System of Units (SI)

References

Imperial units
Units of mass